Jean Marin, real name Yves Morvan (24 February 1909 – 3 March 1995) was a French journalist and resistant. He was the president of Agence France-Presse from 1957 to 1975.

Until 1943, he was one of the voices of Free France on the BBC radio station, in the famous show listened to clandestinely across the British Channel, Les Français parlent aux Français. In 1944, he joined the second armored division of Marshal Leclerc who freed Paris on 25 August. After the capture of Rennes, he was in charge of restarting Radio Brittany and was appointed director by General de Gaulle.

After a passage on the daily newspaper, Les Nouvelles du matin, he arrived at the AFP as general director. Jean Marin, one of the artisans of the statute that gave its autonomy to the AFP (law of 10 January 1957), was elected president of the Agency in 1957. Embodying the independence of the AFP and highly appreciated for its journalistic sense, he was re-elected every three years until 1975. He then left journalism to work in advertising, in Publicis, TVCS then Havas

Marin was awarded the 1995 Prix Cazes for his novel Petit bois pour un grand feu, published by Fayard.

References

External links 
 Yves Morvan Alias Jean Marin on Français Libres.net
 Jean Marin, journaliste on Charles de Gaulle.org
 Yves Morvan Alias Jean Marin on Encyclopedia Universalis

French Resistance members
20th-century French journalists
1909 births
People from Douarnenez
1995 deaths